Sespia ("of Sespe Creek") is an extinct genus of oreodont endemic to North America. Sespia was cat to goat-sized and desert-dwelling. The genus was closely related to the larger Leptauchenia.

 

Fossils of the best known species, the cat-sized S. californica, have been found California and are known from literally thousands of specimens.  The largest species, the goat-sized S. ultima, is known from late Oligocene deposits in Nebraska. S. ultima was once placed in a separate, monotypic, genus as Megasespia middleswarti.  Other species were once placed within Leptauchenia.

References

External links
 San Diego Natural History Museum "Fossil Mysteries Field Guide: Sespia californica

Oreodonts
Oligocene even-toed ungulates
Fossil taxa described in 1930
Prehistoric even-toed ungulate genera